Yong-duuni is a community in Sagnarigu District in the Northern Region of Ghana. It is a less populated community. The inhabitants of the community are predominantly farmers and the women are also into Shea butter production. It has a settlement population of two thousand(2000),2020.

See also
Suburbs of Tamale (Ghana) metropolis

References 

Communities in Ghana
Suburbs of Tamale, Ghana